State Route 227 (SR-227) is a state highway in the U.S. state of Utah that spans  in Farmington, Davis County. The route connects I-15 to SR-106.

Route description
The route starts as 200 West in Farmington at the end of I-15 exit 322. From there, it travels north approximately one half mile until it intersects State Street, at which point it turns to the east and becomes State Street, continuing east until it ends at the intersection of SR-106 (Main Street).

History
State Route 227 was formed in 1964, coinciding with the construction of I-15 through Davis County. It originally went north from an interchange with the interstate north via Walker Lane, then east on State Street to SR-106, which is the route that SR-227 is currently on. No changes have been applied to the highway.

Major intersections

See also

 List of state highways in Utah

References

External links

227
 227
Streets in Utah